Miroslav Houzim (born June 29, 1941) is a Czechoslovak sprint canoer who competed in the mid-1960s. He finished eighth in the C-2 1000 m event at the 1964 Summer Olympics in Tokyo.

References
Sports-reference.com profile

1941 births
Canoeists at the 1964 Summer Olympics
Czechoslovak male canoeists
Living people
Olympic canoeists of Czechoslovakia